James Nathaniel Bivin (December 11, 1909 – November 7, 1982) was a pitcher in Major League Baseball. He appeared in 47 games (14 starts) for the Philadelphia Phillies in 1935. Afterwards, he went on to a lengthy career as a minor league baseball manager. He was the last major league pitcher faced by Babe Ruth, on May 30, 1935.

References

External links

Major League Baseball pitchers
Philadelphia Phillies players
Baseball players from Jackson, Mississippi
1909 births
1983 deaths
Minor league baseball managers
Tulsa Oilers (baseball) players
Galveston Buccaneers players
Baltimore Orioles (IL) players
Nashville Vols players
Shreveport Sports players
Oklahoma City Indians players
Richmond Colts players
Knoxville Smokies players
Greenwood Dodgers players